"Shine On" is the debut single by Swedish group Alcazar, from their debut studio album Casino (2000). The song failed to chart in the main singles chart but reached No. 2 on the Swedish dance chart.

Music video
A music video was produced to promote the single.

Track listings
CD single
"Shine On" (Radio Edit) - 03:32
"Shine On" (Dance Radio Edit) - 03:22

CD maxi-single
"Shine On" (Radio Edit) - 3:32
"Shine On" (Suezia Remix Radio Edit) - 3:22
"Shine On" (Speed Bump Disco Mix) - 4:28
"Shine On" (Suezia Remix Club Edit) - 4:24
"Shine On" (Extended Version) - 5:15

Chart performance

References

External links
 Shine On Video

Alcazar (band) songs
1999 debut singles
1999 songs
Songs written by Anders Hansson (songwriter)
Songs written by Alexander Bard
Bertelsmann Music Group singles